Zanjirabad may refer to:
 Zanjirabad, East Azerbaijan
 Zanjirabad, West Azerbaijan